The Invisible Life of Eurídice Gusmão is a 2019 internationally co-produced drama film directed by Karim Aïnouz based on the 2016 novel The Invisible Life of Eurídice Gusmão by Martha Batalha.

It was screened in the Un Certain Regard section at the 2019 Cannes Film Festival, where it won the top prize. It was selected as the Brazilian entry for the Best International Feature Film at the 92nd Academy Awards, but it was not nominated.

Plot
In Rio de Janeiro during the 1950s, two sisters struggle against repression and bigotry in a patriarchal era.

Cast
 Carol Duarte as Eurídice Gusmão
 Julia Stockler as Guida Gusmão
 Gregorio Duvivier as Antenor
 Bárbara Santos as Filomena
 Flávia Gusmão as Ana Gusmão
 Maria Manoella as Zélia
 Antônio Fonseca as Manuel Gusmão
 Cristina Pereira as Cecília
 Gillray Coutinho as Afonso
 Fernanda Montenegro as Present-Day Eurídice Gusmão

Release
The film had its world premiere at the 2019 Cannes Film Festival on 20 May 2019. It was released in Brazil first in the Northeast Region on 19 September 2019, and on 31 October 2019 in the rest of the country, by Sony Pictures and Vitrine Filmes. On 20 August 2019, Amazon Studios acquired the North American rights to the film.

Reception

Critical response 
The site's critical consensus reads, "Powerfully acted and rich with emotion, Invisible Life beguiles in the moment and leaves a lingering, dreamlike impression."

Guy Lodge of Variety praised Karim Aïnouz's "singular, saturated directorial style" and called the film "a waking dream, saturated in sound, music and color to match its depth of feeling." Writing for The Hollywood Reporter, David Rooney praised the film, commenting, "Despite its many depictions of cruel insensitivity, quotidian unfairness and chronic disappointment, The Invisible Life of Eurídice Gusmão is a haunting drama that quietly celebrates the resilience of women even as they endure beaten-down existences."

See also
 List of submissions to the 92nd Academy Awards for Best International Feature Film
 List of Brazilian submissions for the Academy Award for Best International Feature Film

References

External links
 

2019 films
2019 drama films
2010s feminist films
Brazilian drama films
Films about sisters
Films directed by Karim Aïnouz
Films set in 1950
Films set in Rio de Janeiro (city)
German drama films
2010s Portuguese-language films
2010s German films